The Toll Bridge is a young adult novel by Aidan Chambers.

Seventeen-year-old Piers leaves home to be a toll bridge keeper. He meets Tess and Adam.

Piers is trying to escape the pressures of suffocating parents and a possessive girlfriend. Adam is a charismatic wayfarer who shows up one day and refuses to leave. Piers also befriends a girl named Tess. He and Tess find themselves strangely attracted to Adam and fall under his spell. The three test their sexuality and the bonds of their friendship as they discover who they are — and aren’t — in a harrowing course of events that leaves all three wondering if you can ever really know anyone. Like the other books in Chambers' "The Dance Sequence", The Toll Bridge can be read alone or as part of the series.

Bibliography
 The Toll Bridge, Bodley Head, 1992, ; Laura Geringer Book, 1995. ; reprint Red Fox, 1995, ; Amulet Books, 2009,

References

External links

Author's website

1992 British novels
British young adult novels
The Bodley Head books